The 2020 season was the Atlanta Falcons' 55th season in the National Football League, their fourth playing their home games at Mercedes-Benz Stadium, and their sixth and final season under head coach Dan Quinn.

For the first time since the 2003 season, the Falcons wore new uniforms, which were unveiled on April 8, 2020.

The Falcons failed to improve on their 7–9 season from the previous year following a Week 14 loss to the Los Angeles Chargers and failed to make the playoffs for the third consecutive season the same week. They suffered their worst record since 2013, and finished last place in the NFC South for the first time since 2007. This was in part of the Falcons beginning the season 0–5, their first 0–5 start since 1997, which included two squandered fourth-quarter leads by more than 15 points in back-to-back weeks. Throughout the season, the Falcons squandered six total leads which led to losses and lost eight games with a deficit of 7 or less points. On October 11, following a Week 5 loss to the Carolina Panthers, the Falcons fired head coach Dan Quinn and general manager Thomas Dimitroff. The following day, the Falcons named defensive coordinator Raheem Morris interim head coach. The next day their special teams coordinator Ben Kotwicka was fired.

Draft

Trades
 The Falcons traded wide receiver Mohamed Sanu to the New England Patriots in exchange for a second-round selection.
 The Falcons traded the second-round selection from New England and a fifth-round selection to the Baltimore Ravens in exchange for tight end Hayden Hurst and a fourth-round selection.
 The Falcons traded a sixth-round selection and linebacker Duke Riley to the Philadelphia Eagles in exchange for safety Johnathan Cyprien and a seventh-round selection.

Undrafted free agents

Staff

Final roster

Preseason
The Falcons' preseason schedule was announced on May 7, but was later cancelled due to the COVID-19 pandemic.

Regular season

Schedule
The Falcons' 2020 schedule was announced on May 7.

Note: Intra-division opponents are in bold text.

Game summaries

Week 1: vs. Seattle Seahawks

With the loss, the Falcons failed to win their opening game for the third straight season and lost their first home opener since 2016.

Week 2: at Dallas Cowboys

The Falcons got off to a 29–10 lead in the first half, but the Cowboys outscored them 30–10 in the second half, including three straight scoring drives in the fourth quarter to win 40–39. In the waning moments of the game, with the Falcons clinging to a 39–37 lead, the Cowboys managed to recover an onside kick despite three Falcons being there to recover it; the Falcons then allowed a game-winning field goal. With this loss, the Atlanta Falcons dropped to 0–2 on the season, their first such start to a season since 2007.  The team also dropped to 11–18 all-time against the Cowboys. The Falcons' 39 points scored were the second-most by a losing team all season (only the Browns scored more in a loss, with 42 points against the Ravens in Week 15).

The Falcons recorded three takeaways (all in the first half), but also gave up 572 yards to the Cowboys offense. Atlanta's loss marked the first time a team that scored 39+ points with no giveaways lost a game; teams were previously 440–0 in said situation.

Week 3: vs. Chicago Bears

For the second consecutive week, the Falcons blew a 15+ point lead entering the fourth quarter. With yet another defeat, the Atlanta Falcons lost their first three games of the season for the first time since 2007. The Falcons became the first team in NFL history to lose at least two games in the same season after leading by at least 15 points entering the fourth quarter.

Week 4: at Green Bay Packers

Week 5: vs. Carolina Panthers

Week 6: at Minnesota Vikings

Week 7: vs. Detroit Lions

In the final seconds of the game, Lions quarterback Matthew Stafford would throw a walk-off touchdown pass to tight end T. J. Hockenson to tie the game. The extra point was successfully converted, giving the Lions a 23–22 victory. Previously during the game, Falcons running back Todd Gurley had accidentally scored a touchdown on a play where the Falcons intended to down the ball at the Lions' 1, run out the clock and kick a field goal.
With the loss, the Falcons fell to 1–6. The Falcons wore their red to black gradient uniforms for the first time ever in this game.

Week 8: at Carolina Panthers

With the win, the Atlanta Falcons got their only win in their division.

Week 9: vs. Denver Broncos

The Falcons wore white at home for the first time since 2003 against the Broncos. The Falcons would jump out to a 20–3 at halftime, but the Broncos would attempt a comeback, and outscored Falcons 24–14 in the second half, but the Falcons held on to get the win. With the win, the Falcons advanced to 3–6.

Week 11: at New Orleans Saints

Week 12: vs. Las Vegas Raiders

Week 13: vs. New Orleans Saints

Week 14: at Los Angeles Chargers

With the loss to a game-winning field goal, the Falcons were eliminated from playoff contention for the third straight season and failed to achieve a winning season.

Week 15: vs. Tampa Bay Buccaneers

The Falcons jumped out to a 17–0 lead by halftime, but, in a turn of events similar to Super Bowl LI, Atlanta allowed Tom Brady and the Buccaneers to outscore the Falcons 31–10 in the second half en route to a Tampa Bay victory.

Week 16: at Kansas City Chiefs

Late in the game, the Falcons were in position to tie the game against the defending Super Bowl champions, but Younghoe Koo missed a 39-yard field goal which was partially deflected. With this loss, the Falcons fell to 4-11.

Week 17: at Tampa Bay Buccaneers

With the loss, the Falcons finished last place in the NFC South for the first time since 2007.

Standings

Division

Conference

References

External links
 

Atlanta
Atlanta Falcons seasons
Atlanta Falcons